Moontan is the ninth album by Dutch rock band Golden Earring, released in 1973. It contains the radio hit "Radar Love", and was voted ninth-best Dutch pop album ever by readers of music magazine Oor in 2008. In the Q & Mojo Classic Special Edition Pink Floyd & The Story of Prog Rock, the album rated No. 32 in its list of "40 Cosmic Rock Albums". Moontan is the band's most successful album in the United States, being the only Golden Earring album to be certified Gold by the RIAA.

"Vanilla Queen" twice samples Marilyn Monroe's character in There's No Business Like Show Business: "Well, in simple English I'm..." from the "Lazy" performance and "What's your name, Honey?" from the "Heat Wave" performance.

Track listing
All songs written by Hay and Kooymans except where noted.

Original track listing (Dutch/European) 
 "Candy's Going Bad" – 6:12
 "Are You Receiving Me" (John Fenton, Hay) – 9:31
 "Suzy Lunacy (Mental Rock)" – 4:24
 "Radar Love" – 6:26
 "Just Like Vince Taylor" – 4:33
 "Vanilla Queen" – 9:16

US/UK track listing 
 "Radar Love" – 6:26
 "Candy's Going Bad" – 6:12
 "Vanilla Queen" – 9:20
 "Big Tree, Blue Sea" – 8:13
 "Are You Receiving Me" (Fenton, Hay, Kooymans) – 9:32

This is also the track listing on the original UK vinyl release (see above), as well as on early U.S. LP pressings (Track/MCA 396). The U.S. version of the album was originally issued with the UK "exotic dancer" cover, but this was quickly withdrawn and replaced with the "earring" cover depicted at right.

In September 2021, Moontan Remastered & Expanded, a new 2CD edition of the 1973 classic album, was released, featuring the original album newly remastered for the first time from the first-generation master tapes, and featuring six bonus tracks, nine previously unreleased mixes/different versions, a 32-page booklet with a new essay, memorabilia, and photos.

CD 1: Original album version remastered plus bonus tracks 
 "Candy's Going Bad" – 6:13
 "Are You Receiving Me" – 9:32
 "Suzy Lunacy (Mental Rock)" – 4:26
 "Radar Love" – 6:26
 "Just Like Vince Taylor" – 4:22
 "Vanilla Queen" – 9:19
 "Big Tree, Blue Sea (1973 version)" – 8:12
 "Candy’s Going Bad (single version)" – 2:52
 "Radar Love (single version)" – 3:45
 "The Song Is Over" – 4:52
 "Instant Poetry" – 5:08
 "From Heaven, From Hell (1974 version)" – 6:05

CD 2: The Moontan Sessions 
 "Vanilla Queen (early version)" – 10:03
 "Radar Love (basic track)" – 6:27
 "The Song Is Over (basic track)" – 5:14
 "Are You Receiving Me (basic track)" – 9:30
 "Candy’s Going Bad (rough mix)" – 4:06
 "Vanilla Queen part 1 (rough mix)" – 5:36
 "Just Like Vince Taylor (alternate mix)" – 4:27
 "Big Tree, Blue Sea part 1 (rough mix)" – 3:14
 "Radar Love (instrumental mono mix)" – 6:30

Personnel
 Barry Hay — lead vocals, flute, saxophone, backing vocals, percussion, sound effects
 George Kooymans — electric and acoustic guitars, lead vocals, backing vocals, sound effects
 Rinus Gerritsen — bass guitar, minimoog, ARP 2500 synthesizer, piano, organ, accordion, sound effects
 Cesar Zuiderwijk — drums, percussion

Additional personnel
 Patricia Paay — backing vocals
 Bertus Borgers — saxophone
 Eelco Gelling — slide guitar on 'Radar Love'

Production 
 Producer: Golden Earring
 Executive Producer: Fred Haayen
 Engineer: Pieter Nieboer
 Engineer: Damon Lyon-Shaw (mixing), IBC Studios, London, England
 Arranger: Golden Earring

Charts

Album

Singles

Candy's Going Bad

Radar Love

Certifications

References

External links 
 Information on "Radar Love" and Moontan

Golden Earring albums
1973 albums
MCA Records albums
Polydor Records albums
Track Records albums
Obscenity controversies in music